The 1967 Swedish speedway season was the 1967 season of motorcycle speedway in Sweden.

Individual

Individual Championship
The 1967 Swedish Individual Speedway Championship final was held on 10 October in Gothenburg. Ove Fundin won the Swedish Championship for the seventh time.

Junior Championship
 
Winner - Christer Löfqvist

Team

Team Championship
For the fifth consecutive season Getingarna won division 1 and were declared the winners of the Swedish Speedway Team Championship. Despite Arne Carlsson retiring and losing Leif Larsson for the season the Getingarna team recruited well by gaining Anders Michanek and Leif Enecrona to support Göte Nordin and Bengt Jansson.

Four divisions returned for the 1967 season with the addition of Dackarna (returning after missing 1966) and three other clubs; Bysarna, Vikingarna and Solkatterna.

Indianerna won the second division, while Dackarna and Smederna won the third division east and west respectively.

See also 
 Speedway in Sweden

References

Speedway leagues
Professional sports leagues in Sweden
Swedish
Seasons in Swedish speedway